Kastoria Bus Lines is a bus and coach operator in Melbourne, Australia. It operates five routes under contract to Public Transport Victoria. It is owned by Northern Transit Holdings, which also operates Broadmeadows Bus Service, Nationwide Tours and Seymour Bus Lines.

History
In 1964, the Spyrou and Sikavitsas families purchased routes 475, 476, 477 and 479 from Barnes Bus Lines and formed Kastoria Bus Lines. 

In January 1971, the company was split, with the Spyrou gaining full control of Kastoria Bus Lines with routes 475 and 476, and the Sikavitsas family taking 477 and 479 to form Tullamarine Bus Lines. In May 1973, Kastoria Bus Lines acquired route 501. 

Devesons Bus & Coach Service was acquired in October 1979. Coaches are operated under the Nationwide Tours brand.

In August 2009, the Spyrou family sold Kastoria Bus Lines to Dominic Sita, son of the Sita Buslines's founder George Sita. Kastoria Bus Lines has since been reorganised under Northern Transit Holdings, along with other Dominic Sita's bus businesses, including Broadmeadows Bus Service which was acquired in 2011.

Fleet
As of November 2022, the fleet consisted of 82 buses and coaches. The fleet livery is blue and white.

References

External links

Company website

Bus transport in Melbourne
Bus companies of Victoria (Australia)
Transport companies established in 1964
1964 establishments in Australia